Harun-or-Rashid is a Bangladeshi academic. He is a former vice-chancellor of Bangladesh National University.

Education
Born in Barishal District, Rashid obtained bachelor's and master's degrees from the University of Dhaka. He earned his Ph.D. degree from the University of London in 1983. He was engaged in post-doctoral research at the Institute of Commonwealth Studies in University of London during 1992–93 under Commonwealth Academic Staff Fellowship.

Career
In 1979, Rashid started his career as a lecturer in political science, University of Chittagong. He became an assistant professor in 1984. He returned to the University of Dhaka as assistant professor in 1985. He went on to become associate professor and professor of political science in 1990 and 1995 respectively.

At the University of Dhaka, Rashid served as the pro-vice-chancellor during 2009–2012 and the provost of A.F. Rahman Hall during 1997–2001.

Rashid joined the Bangladesh National University as the vice-chancellor on 6 March 2013.

Works
 The Foreshadowing of Bangladesh: Bengal Muslim League and Muslim Politics, 1906–1947 (1987; UPL 2003,2012,2015,2018)
 Bangladesh: Politics, Governance and Constitutional Development, 1757–2018 (2018)
 Statehood Ideal of the Bengalis and the Emergence of Bangladesh (2001)
 Inside Bengal Politics 1936–1947: Unpublished Correspondence of Partition Leaders (2003, 2018)
 Unfinished Memoirs of Bangabandhu Revisited (2013, 2015, 2018)

Awards 

 Bangla Academy Literary Award (2021)

References

Further reading
 

Living people
University of Dhaka alumni
Academic staff of the University of Dhaka
Academic staff of the University of Chittagong
Vice-Chancellors of National University Bangladesh
Recipients of Bangla Academy Award
Year of birth missing (living people)
Place of birth missing (living people)